Lokal express is a newspaper published in Luxembourg.

Luxembourgish-language newspapers
Newspapers published in Luxembourg